Miss Mary is a 1986 drama film directed by María Luisa Bemberg and starring Julie Christie, Nacha Guevara and Eduardo Pavlovsky. It was an Argentine-American co-production shot on location in Argentina.

Plot
In 1938, Englishwoman Mary Mulligan (Julie Christie) arrives at the lavish estate of a wealthy Argentine family living outside of Buenos Aires. "Miss Mary" serves as the family's governess over the course of the next several years. As the primary caretaker of the family's three children, Mary teaches them English and oversees their childhood and adolescent development, at times both nurturing and disciplining them. As they move into their teenage years, the children mature, exploring sexuality and their place in society.

Meanwhile, the aristocratic world around them is falling apart. The adults converse about Argentine politics, hinting at the impending arrival of Juan Perón on the political scene, which will signal an abrupt end to their lifestyle. Compounding the problem is the state of the family itself: the patriarch, Alfredo (Eduardo Pavlovsky), becomes physically intimate with another woman. Enraged, his wife, Mecha, (Nacha Guevara) shoots a pistol blindly into the parlor where the affair is unfolding, and although the bullets cause no injury, the children are greatly disturbed. Mecha slowly deteriorates mentally and emotionally and grows stoically detached in the presence of her family.

A few years down the road, Teresa, the youngest daughter in the family, proudly announces to her older sister, Carolina, that she has lost her virginity. Johnny, their older brother, has a sexual encounter with a woman more than twice his age. Confused by the experience, he rushes home despite a thunderstorm and confronts Mary in her bedroom. After a brief moment of awkwardness, they embrace and spend the night together, capping off a long, vaguely-defined relationship that has displayed both maternal and romantic tendencies. As Johnny sneaks back half-nakedly to his room in the early morning, his mother happens to see him stumble down the hallway. Immediately aware that Miss Mary has gone too far, she relays the information to her indifferent husband before returning to find Mary already packing up her things. She formally dismisses Mary, just as Mary reports that she is planning to leave the family anyway.

Later, Teresa is shown preparing for her wedding, which she expresses doubts about following through with. Motivated by her support for her sister and her contempt for the shallow world in which she lives, Carolina announces her intentions to boycott the wedding. Mary is present at the wedding, and she slips Johnny a note as he walks down the aisle in a procession of the bride's family. Shortly thereafter, Mary converses with Johnny, ultimately revealing that she plans to return to England now that World War II has ended. She boards a cruise liner and departs.

Note
This film is not to be confused with Miss Mary, the 1957 Hindi remake of the Telugu movie Missamma.

Reception
The film was nominated for Best Foreign Film of 1986 by the U.S. National Board of Review of Motion Pictures.

References

External links 
 

1986 films
1986 drama films
1980s English-language films
English-language Argentine films
1980s Spanish-language films
Films set in Argentina
Films shot in Argentina
Films set in the Infamous Decade
Fictional governesses
Argentine drama films
New World Pictures films